Niilo Nikunen (14 June 1913 – 19 July 1991) was a Finnish skier. He competed in the Nordic combined event at the 1936 Winter Olympics.

References

External links
 

1913 births
1991 deaths
Finnish male Nordic combined skiers
Olympic Nordic combined skiers of Finland
Nordic combined skiers at the 1936 Winter Olympics
People from Lemi
Sportspeople from South Karelia
20th-century Finnish people